Albert Held (March 25, 1866 – 1924) was an American architect. He was born in New Ulm, Minnesota on March 25, 1866, and studied for two years at the University of Minnesota.  He first worked as a draftsman

Held moved to Spokane, Washington after the fire of 1889 because of the work necessary to rebuild the city. He was the first architect in the American Institute of Architects from Spokane/Eastern Washington.  He died in 1924 after a long illness.

He designed a number of buildings in Spokane, Washington that are listed on the U.S. National Register of Historic Places.

Works include (with attribution):
Amman, W. 1516 Riverside
Breslin, S. 729 Bernard
Frequency Changing Station, E. 1420 Celesta Ave.
The Globe Hotel, 204 N. Division St.
Holley-Mason Building, S. 157 Howard
Knickerbocker, (built 1911) S. 501-507 Howard
San Marco, W. 1229 Riverside
Spokane Public Library-East Side Branch, 25 Altamont St.
Spokane Public Library-North Monroe Branch, 925 W. Montgomery St. 
James and Corinne Williams House, 1225 W. 19th Ave.

References

External links

List of Held designed projects

20th-century American architects
Architects from Washington (state)
1866 births
1924 deaths
University of Minnesota alumni
People from Minnesota
21st-century American architects